Zazhigino is the name of several rural localities in Russia:
Zazhigino, Arkhangelsk Oblast, a village in Pavlovsky Selsoviet of Kargopolsky District of Arkhangelsk Oblast
Zazhigino, Pskov Oblast, a village in Bezhanitsky District of Pskov Oblast